Paradorella is a genus of beetles in the family Buprestidae, the jewel beetles. They are native to Africa.

Species include:

Species
 Paradorella capensis (Kerremans, 1903)
 Paradorella natalensis Bellamy, 2008
 Paradorella strandi Obenberger, 1923
 Paradorella subtilis (Obenberger, 1931)
 Paradorella wiedemannii (Gory & Laporte, 1839)

References

Buprestidae genera
Beetles of Africa